Badarna is a 1968 Swedish drama film directed by Yngve Gamlin. Halvar Björk won the award for Best Actor at the 5th Guldbagge Awards.

Cast
 Ingrid Thulin as Cook
 Halvar Björk as Knoppen Berglund
 Gunilla Olsson as Bua
 Björn Gustafson as Gott-Melker
 Åke Lindström as Kjellgren, social servant
 Betty Tuvén as Minni
 Gustaf Färingborg as Löfgren, Bua's father
 Leif Hedberg as Sam
 Lars Andersson as Karl
 Göthe Grefbo as Supervisor
 Stig Engström as Young man with big car

References

External links
 
 

1968 films
1968 drama films
Swedish drama films
1960s Swedish-language films
Swedish black-and-white films
Films directed by Yngve Gamlin
1960s Swedish films